"Say Hey (I Love You)" is a single by Michael Franti & Spearhead featuring Jamaican soul singer Cherine Anderson released in 2008 from their album All Rebel Rockers. The single was produced by Sly & Robbie. The music video peaked at number 5 on the VH1 Top 20 countdown and the single peaked at number 18 on the Billboard Hot 100, making it Franti's first Hot 100 chart entry. It also peaked at number 3 on Billboard Digital Songs, number 1 on Billboard R&B Songs, and number 3 on Billboard Modern Rock Songs. Digital sales of "Say Hey (I Love You)" have topped 120,000 downloads.

The music video for this song was filmed at Vigário Geral favela in Rio de Janeiro, Brazil.

Background

In a January 2010 interview, Franti explained he wrote the lyrics to this song in the steam of a mirror just after a shower. He joked to noted UK R&B writer Pete Lewis of the award-winning Blues & Soul: "I was staying at (US actor) Woody Harrelson's house. And, when Woody called and asked how the songwriting was going, I was like 'It's going great! I think I just wrote a hit song in the bathroom!'... And straightaway he was like 'So, is it a Number One or a Number Two?'!!"

Use in other media
The song appeared in the Showtime series Weeds for a flash mob in the season five premiere episode and during the opening credits of the 2010 film Valentine's Day. It also appeared in the 2010 films Ramona and Beezus and The Back-Up Plan and the 2011 films Bucky Larson: Born to Be a Star and Alvin and the Chipmunks: Chipwrecked. This song is featured in EA Sports video game 2010 FIFA World Cup South Africa. It was also featured in a 2010 advertisement for Corona Light beer, and in advertisements for The Oprah Winfrey Shows final season.  Franti recorded a version with alternate lyrics in support of the San Francisco Giants in connection with their World Series appearance in 2010. The song is featured in the 2015 animated musical comedy Strange Magic. It is played in the sequel Beverly Hills Chihuahua 2.

Chart positions

Weekly

Year-end

Cover versions
The song was covered for the 2015 film Strange Magic.

Certifications

References

2008 songs
2009 singles
Anti- (record label) singles
Reggae fusion songs
Songs written by Michael Franti